Rafael Barbosa do Nascimento (born 10 August 1983) is a Brazilian footballer who plays for Hajer Club in the Saudi Professional League.

Never played in Brazil national league level, however he left for Europe in July 2009.

Biography

Brazil state leagues
Born in Rio de Janeiro, Barbosa started his career with Madureira, signed a -year contract on 1 July 2003. He was loaned to Flamengo (SP) in 2005. In October 2005 he was signed by Olaria.

In December 2005, he signed a 1-year contract with Brusque for 2006 Campeonato Catarinense. He extended his contract in December 2006 for 2007 Campeonato Catarinense.

In June 2007, he signed a 1-year contract with Iguaçu. He played 10 out of possible 22 games of 2007 Copa Paraná . In December 2007 he left for fellow Paraná state side Rio Branco (PR) for 2008 Campeonato Paranaense, started 14 out of possible 15 league matches.

In June 2008, he was signed by CFZ of 2008 Campeonato Carioca Segunda Divisão. He played 3 times for CFZ in stage 1 of the league.

Barbosa returned to Brusque in December 2008, signed a contract until the end of 2009 Campeonato Catarinense. He played 9 league matches for Brusque, out of possible 18 matches.

In April 2009 he returned to Rio again, this time signed by Volta Redonda for Copa Rio. He made his Cup debut on 21 May, round 8 of the second stage. He played 4 times in the cup before terminated his contract on 22 June.

Europe
In July 2009 he was signed by Azerbaijani club FK Baku. He played all 4 matches for Baku at 2009–10 UEFA Champions League qualifying rounds. However, he was released along with Daniel Opriţa on 16 October 2009 due to injury.

In 2010–11 season he left for Bulgarian club Slavia Sofia.

References

External links 
 Slavia Sofia Profile
 
 Profile on FK Baku Official Site 
 Profile on Allsoccerplayers 

Brazilian expatriate footballers
Madureira Esporte Clube players
Associação Atlética Iguaçu players
Rio Branco Sport Club players
Brusque Futebol Clube players
Volta Redonda FC players
FC Baku players
PFC Slavia Sofia players
First Professional Football League (Bulgaria) players
Association football defenders
Expatriate footballers in Azerbaijan
Expatriate footballers in Bulgaria
Expatriate footballers in Saudi Arabia
Brazilian expatriate sportspeople in Azerbaijan
Brazilian expatriate sportspeople in Bulgaria
Brazilian expatriate sportspeople in Saudi Arabia
Footballers from Rio de Janeiro (city)
Brazilian footballers
1983 births
Living people
Hajer FC players
Saudi Professional League players